The Pernambuco coastal forests is an ecoregion of the Tropical moist broadleaf forests Biome, and the South American Atlantic Forest biome. It is located in northeastern Brazil.

Geography
The Pernambuco coastal forests occupy an 80 km-wide strip along the Atlantic coast of northeastern Brazil in the states of Pernambuco and Alagoas.

The Goiana River of Pernambuco marks the forests' northern extent, and the Mundaú River of Alagoas the southern extent.

The ecoregion is bounded on the east by the Atlantic Ocean and the coastal Atlantic Coast restingas forests and Rio Piranhas mangroves. To the east, the forests transition to the drier Pernambuco interior forests and Caatinga.

Climate
The ecoregion has a tropical climate with annual rainfall ranging from 1,750 to 2,000 mm. There is a dry period from October through January.

Natural history

Flora
The four-tiered evergreen Atlantic moist forests are the predominant vegetation type.

Fauna
The ecoregion is an endemic bird area that harbors 13 threatened species of birds. It also harbors the last populations of the red-handed howler monkey (Alouatta belzebul) and blond capuchin (Sapajus flavius) in the Atlantic Forests.

Conservation and threats
Coastal forests in Pernambuco have a long history of deforestation. The first cycle of destruction was due to "Pau-brasil" (Caesalpinia echinata) extraction. After the extraction of Pau-brasil, through the mid-20th century, the sugarcane industry was mainly responsible for the forest clearing.

Forests remnants are small, most with less 10 km² and surrounded by sugarcane fields. There is only 87 km² of isolated conservation units. It isn't an enough amount to maintain biodiversity and key ecological processes. The largest reserve is Murici Ecological Station (6132 ha).

See also
List of plants of Atlantic Forest vegetation of Brazil — flora of its diverse ecoregions.
Ecoregions in the Atlantic Forest biome
List of ecoregions in Brazil

References

Atlantic Forest
Ecoregions of Brazil
Forests of Brazil
Environment of Alagoas
Environment of Pernambuco
.

Geography of Alagoas
Geography of Pernambuco
Neotropical tropical and subtropical moist broadleaf forests